Aline da Silva Rodrigues (born April 7, 1995, in Rio de Janeiro) is a Brazilian swimmer.

International career

On September 3, 2014, participating in the José Finkel Trophy (short course competition) in Guaratinguetá, she broke the South American record in the 4x200-metre freestyle with a time of 7:58.54, along with Larissa Oliveira, Gabrielle Roncatto and Daniele de Jesus.

In September 2016, at the José Finkel Trophy (short course competition), she broke the South American record in the 4×200-metre freestyle relay, with a time of 7:52.71, along with Joanna Maranhão, Manuella Lyrio and Larissa Oliveira.

At the 2018 South American Swimming Championships, she won a silver medal in the 4×200-metre freestyle relay.

At the 2019 Pan American Games held in Lima, Peru, she won a bronze medal in the Women's 4 × 200 metre freestyle relay, along with Larissa Oliveira, Manuella Lyrio and Gabrielle Roncatto. She also finished 5th in the Women's 400 metre freestyle.

She competed in the 2020 Summer Olympics, where she finished 10th in the Women's 4 × 200 metre freestyle relay, along with Larissa Oliveira, Nathalia Almeida and Gabrielle Roncatto.

She was at the 2022 World Aquatics Championships held in Budapest, Hungary. In the Brazilian 4x200m freestyle relay, formed by Maria Paula Heitmann, Giovanna Diamante, Rodrigues and Stephanie Balduccini, she finished in 6th place with a time of 7:58.38. This was the best placement of Brazil in this race in Worlds at all times. 

At the 2022 FINA World Swimming Championships (25 m), in Melbourne, Australia, in the Women's 4 × 200 metre freestyle relay, she broke the South American record with a time of 7:48.42, along with Giovanna Diamante, Gabrielle Roncatto and Stephanie Balduccini. Brazil's relay finished 7th in the final.  She also finished 9th in the Women's 4 × 100 metre freestyle relay.

References

Living people
Brazilian female freestyle swimmers
1995 births
Swimmers from Rio de Janeiro (city)
Swimmers at the 2019 Pan American Games
Pan American Games bronze medalists for Brazil
Pan American Games medalists in swimming
Medalists at the 2019 Pan American Games
Swimmers at the 2020 Summer Olympics
Olympic swimmers of Brazil
21st-century Brazilian women
South American Games gold medalists for Brazil
South American Games medalists in swimming
Competitors at the 2022 South American Games